The Ministry of Transport and Infocommunications (MTIC), formerly known as the Ministry of Communications, is a cabinet-level ministry in the government of Brunei which oversees civil aviation, land and maritime transport, telecommunications and meteorology in the country. It is currently led by a minister and the incumbent is Pengiran Shamhary Pengiran Mustapha, who took office since 7 June 2022. The ministry is headquartered in Bandar Seri Begawan.

Portfolio 

 Maritime and Port Authority Brunei Darussalam (Pihak Berkuasa Maritim Dan Pelabuhan Brunei Darussalam, MPABD)

Budget 
In the 2021–22 fiscal year, the ministry had been allocated a budget of B$101 million, an 8.7 percent increase from the previous year.

Ministers

Notes

References

External links 
 

Transport and Infocommunications
Transport in Brunei
Communications in Brunei